Extremely Loud & Incredibly Close is a 2011 American drama film directed by Stephen Daldry and written by Eric Roth. Based on the 2005 novel of the same name by Jonathan Safran Foer, it stars Tom Hanks, Sandra Bullock, Thomas Horn, Max von Sydow, Viola Davis, John Goodman, Jeffrey Wright, and Zoe Caldwell in her final film role. Production took place in New York City. The film had a limited release in the United States on December 25, 2011 by Warner Bros. Pictures, and a wide release on January 20, 2012. Despite mixed reviews, the film was nominated for two Academy Awards: Best Picture and Best Supporting Actor for von Sydow. The film earned $55.2 million. The film was released in Blu-ray, DVD, and digital download formats in Region 1 on March 27, 2012.

Plot
Nine-year-old Oskar Schell is autistic and lives in New York City with his parents Linda and Thomas Schell. He is close to his father, who stimulates him with missions to hunt for clues to New York City's "lost Sixth Borough". The tasks he is given force him to explore his surroundings and communicate with other people, which is not easy for him.

On September 11, 2001, schools close early, and Oskar arrives home alone to find six answering machine messages left by his father from the World Trade Center. Oskar hides under his bed, where his grandmother finds him and stays until Linda returns home. Oskar is angry at his father's funeral, unable to make sense of his death.

A year later, Oskar has a secret hiding place with memories of his father, including the answering machine and its messages. In his father's room, he accidentally shatters a vase, and inside finds a key in an envelope with the word "Black" on it. He becomes obsessed with finding the lock the key fits, believing it a clue from his father. He finds 472 Blacks in the New York phone book and plans to visit each one. He lies to his mother, with whom he is becoming increasingly distant, about his outings. He first meets Abby Black, who is in the process of divorcing her husband, but she tells Oskar she did not know his father. Further encounters are fruitless, but he meets a variety of people, photographing and recording notes on each one in a scrapbook.

One day, Oskar ventures into his grandmother's apartment, but instead of finding her there, encounters the reclusive elderly renter that has been living there, whom his grandmother had warned him to avoid. The renter does not talk, communicating instead with the words "yes" and "no" tattooed on his hands and a writing pad. Oskar confides in him, and the man offers to accompany Oskar on his outings. As they explore the city together, Oskar learns to face his fears, such as those of public transport and bridges. Eventually, Oskar concludes that the stranger is his grandfather and plays the increasingly desperate answering machine recordings, but the man becomes agitated, refuses to listen to the final one, and tells Oskar to stop his search. Later, Oskar sees him arguing with his grandmother and packing to leave, and angrily confronts him as his taxi pulls away.

Oskar then notices a phone number for an estate sale circled on the back of a newspaper clipping of his father's. He dials the number and reaches a surprised Abby, who takes Oskar to meet her ex-husband William. William realizes Oskar's key is the one he has been looking for, left to him by his own deceased father in the vase, unbeknownst to him when he sold it to Thomas at the estate sale. Oskar confides that on the day of the attacks, he was home when the phone rang a sixth time, but was too afraid to answer. After witnessing the tower collapse on TV as the phone call cut off, he replaced the answering machine so his mother would never find out. He leaves the key with William, but runs away from Abby, distraught.

Back in his room, he proceeds to destroy the material from his search, until his mother reveals to him that she had been aware of all his outings, and had gone ahead of him to meet all the Blacks to prepare them for his visit. Finally realizing how much his mother cares about him, he accepts his father's death and writes letters to all the people he met to thank them for their kindness, including his grandfather, who returns to live with his grandmother. He gives his mother his scrapbook from his adventures filled with pop-ups and pull tabs, titled "Extremely Loud and Incredibly Close".

Soon after, Oskar visits a spot in Central Park he and his father frequented, and looking underneath his father's favorite swing, finds a message from his father, congratulating him for finishing what would have been their final expedition, giving Oskar the closure he desperately needed.

Cast

 Thomas Horn as Oskar Schell
 Max von Sydow as The Renter
 Sandra Bullock as Linda Schell
 Tom Hanks as Thomas Schell
 Viola Davis as Abby Black
 Madison Arnold as Alan Black
 John Goodman as Stan the Doorman
 Jeffrey Wright as William Black
 Zoe Caldwell as Oskar's grandmother
 Hazelle Goodman as Hazelle Black
 Adrian Martinez as Hector Black
 Stephen Henderson as Walt the Locksmith
 Stephanie Kurtzuba as Elaine Black
 Catherine Curtin as Leigh-Anne Black

Production

Development
In August 2010, it was reported that director Stephen Daldry and producer Scott Rudin had been working on a film adaptation of the novel for five years.  Eric Roth was hired to write the script. Extremely Loud & Incredibly Close is a co-production with Paramount Pictures and Warner Bros., with Warner being the "lead studio". Chris Menges served as director of photography, K. K. Barrett as production designer and Ann Roth as costume designer.

Casting
Tom Hanks and Sandra Bullock were the first to be cast in the film. A nationwide search for child actors between the ages of 9 and 13 began in late October 2010 for the role of Oskar Schell. Thomas Horn, who had won over $30,000 at age 12 on the 2010 Jeopardy! Kids Week, was chosen for the role in December 2010. Horn had had no prior acting interest but was approached by the producers based on his quiz-show appearance. On January 3, 2011 The Hollywood Reporter announced that John Goodman joined the cast. Nico Muhly was credited in the film poster as the composer, but on October 21, 2011 it was reported that Alexandre Desplat was chosen to compose the score. Similarly, James Gandolfini was credited on the initial poster, and was originally in the film as a love interest for Bullock's character. Test audiences reacted negatively to their scenes together, and he was cut. Austrian actress Senta Berger was offered a role in the film, but declined.

Characterization
Daldry stated in an interview that the film is about "a special child who is somewhere on the autistic spectrum, trying to find his own logic – trying to make sense of something that literally doesn’t make sense to him." When asked how much research was necessary to realistically portray a character with such a condition, he answered "we did a lot of research," and that he "spent a lot of time with different experts of Asperger’s and talked to them." In the film, Oskar reveals that he was tested for Asperger syndrome, but the results were inconclusive.  As Daldry explained: "Every child is different on the autistic spectrum, so we created our own version of a child that was in some way – not heavily, but somewhere on that spectrum in terms of the fears and the phobias." There are no references to autism in the novel. Author Jonathan Safran Foer stated in an interview that he had never thought of Oskar as autistic, but added, "Which is not to say he isn't – it's really up for readers to decide. It's not to say that plenty of descriptions of him wouldn't be fitting, only that I didn't have them in mind at the time."

Filming
Principal photography was expected to begin in January, but started in March 2011. Filming went on hiatus in June. On May 16, 2011, scenes were shot on the streets of the Lower East Side and Chinatown. Cranes were used to shoot scenes on the corner of Orchard Street and Grand Street. Extremely Loud & Incredibly Close was filmed with an Arri Alexa and was the first Hollywood feature film to use Arri's ArriRaw format to store the data for post-production. Several scenes for the film were shot in Central Park, a location that is integral to the storyline, near The Lake and Wollman Rink. The Seaport Jewelry Exchange on Fulton St. was used for a pivotal scene in the film when the son is searching through a jewelry store and its back room.

Release
Daldry had hoped to have the film released around the tenth anniversary of the terrorist attacks of September 11, 2001. A test screening took place in New York on September 25, 2011 to a positive reaction. Extremely Loud & Incredibly Close had a limited release in the United States on December 25, 2011, and a wide release on January 20, 2012. It was released in the United Kingdom on February 17, 2012.

Home media release
The film was released in Blu-ray, DVD, and digital download formats in Region 1 on March 27, 2012.

Reception

Critical response

Review aggregation website Rotten Tomatoes reported a 45% approval rating and an average rating of 5.60/10 based on 191 reviews. The website's consensus reads, "Extremely Loud & Incredibly Close has a story worth telling, but it deserves better than the treacly and pretentious treatment director Stephen Daldry gives it." Metacritic, which assigns a weighted average score out of 100 to reviews from mainstream critics, gives the film a score of 46 based on 41 reviews. Audiences polled by CinemaScore gave the film an average grade of "A-" on an A+ to F scale.

Critics were sharply divided about the subject matter of the film. Betsy Sharkey of the Los Angeles Times wrote that the film was a "handsomely polished, thoughtfully wrapped Hollywood production about the national tragedy of 9/11 that seems to have forever redefined words like 'unthinkable,' 'unforgivable,' 'catastrophic'." Andrea Peyser of the New York Post called it "Extremely, incredibly exploitive" and a "quest for emotional blackmail, cheap thrills and a naked ploy for an Oscar." Peter Howell of the Toronto Star gave the film one out of four stars saying that "[the] film feels all wrong on every level, mistaking precociousness for perceptiveness and catastrophe for a cuddling session. It's calculated as Oscar bait, but the bait is poisoned by opportunism and feigned sensitivity".

Accolades

Best Picture nomination controversy
Before the film's release, Extremely Loud & Incredibly Close was expected to be a major contender at the 84th Academy Awards (Stephen Daldry's previous two films had garnered Best Picture nominations). However, due to the film's polarizing reception and being ignored by most of the critics groups' awards; namely, the Golden Globes, the BAFTAs, and the Screen Actors Guild Awards, it was no longer deemed a major contender. Nevertheless, the film was nominated for Best Picture and Max von Sydow for Best Supporting Actor. Critics and audiences criticized the film's nomination for Best Picture, with some calling the film one of the worst Best Picture nominees ever. Chris Krapek of The Huffington Post wrote very negatively about the film's nomination, calling the film "not only the worst reviewed Best Picture nominee of the last 10 years, [but] easily the worst film of 2011". Paste Magazine's Adam Vitcavage called the film's consensus for a Best Picture nominee "certainly the worst for at least 28 years", and David Gritten of The Telegraph calls the nomination "mysterious".

Many critics have blamed the new Best Picture rules for the nomination. John Young at Entertainment Weekly says that when it comes to the new rules, "it's better to be loved by a small and passionate group instead of liked by a much larger group", and Jen Chaney at The Washington Post, believes that, "the Academy should've just stuck to the 10 rule so that films like Dragon Tattoo or Harry Potter could've joined the other worthy contenders, because if you’re going to create a bunch of drama around the number of nominees and then come up one shy of what has become the typical total, that just feels like a letdown."  The Week writes that the new rules are a failure, as it lets "smaller, divisive movies that the Academy had hoped to weed out, like Tree of Life and Extremely Loud and Incredibly Close in, but prevents praised crowd pleasers like Bridesmaids and The Girl With the Dragon Tattoo from being nominated."

Opposingly, awards pundit Tom O'Neil defended the nomination and the film, stating: "This is a movie that we unwisely wrote off, but we did it because we believed the critics. This movie delivers. It is a superb motion picture. It is moving, it is relevant to our time, it is extremely well made."

At the 84th Academy Awards, Extremely Loud & Incredibly Close lost in both of its categories (Best Picture to The Artist and Best Supporting Actor to Christopher Plummer for Beginners).

Soundtrack

See also
List of cultural references to the September 11 attacks
 Oscar bait

References

External links
 
 
 
 
 
 

2011 films
2010s coming-of-age drama films
American coming-of-age drama films
Films about autism
Films about children
Films based on the September 11 attacks
Films based on American novels
Films shot in New York City
Warner Bros. films
Films directed by Stephen Daldry
Films with screenplays by Eric Roth
Films produced by Scott Rudin
Films scored by Alexandre Desplat
Films about grieving
Jonathan Safran Foer
2010s English-language films
2010s American films
2012 controversies in the United States
Film controversies
Film controversies in the United States
Obscenity controversies in film
Advertising and marketing controversies in film